La Macarena Airport, also known as El Refugio Airport,  is an airport serving the Guayabero River town of La Macarena in the Meta Department of Colombia.

Airlines and destinations

See also

Transport in Colombia
List of airports in Colombia

References

External links
OpenStreetMap - La Macarena
OurAirports - El Refugio/La Macarena Airport
SkyVector - La Macarena
FallingRain - La Macarena Airport

Airports in Colombia
Buildings and structures in Meta Department